Oprando Bottura (25 January 1896 – 6 October 1961) was an Italian athlete who competed in the 1920 Summer Olympics. In 1920 he finished 17th in the javelin throw competition.

Achievements

References

External links
 

1896 births
1961 deaths
Italian male javelin throwers
Olympic athletes of Italy
Athletes (track and field) at the 1920 Summer Olympics